Shiray Kaka (née Tane; born 26 March 1995) is a New Zealand rugby sevens player. She won a gold medal with the Black Ferns sevens team at the 2020 Summer Olympics in Tokyo.

Rugby career

2013–2016 
Kaka made her international debut for the Black Ferns sevens at the 2013 Dubai sevens. She was named as a travelling reserve for the 2016 Rio Olympic squad.

2021 
In 2021, Kaka was part of the Black Ferns sevens squad that won a gold medal at the delayed Tokyo Olympics.

2022 
Kaka was named in the Black Ferns Sevens squad for the 2022 Commonwealth Games in Birmingham. She won a bronze medal at the event. She was a member of the side that finished as runner-up at the Sevens Rugby World Cup held in Cape Town, South Africa in September 2022.

Personal life 
In 2019, She was living in Japan where she was studying to be a dog trainer and starting a business in adventure dog walking. Her husband is former All Black Sevens star Gillies Kaka.

References

External links
 
 
 

1995 births
Living people
New Zealand Māori rugby union players
New Zealand rugby union players
New Zealand female rugby sevens players
New Zealand women's international rugby sevens players
New Zealand rugby sevens players
Olympic rugby sevens players of New Zealand
Rugby sevens players at the 2020 Summer Olympics
Medalists at the 2020 Summer Olympics
Olympic gold medalists for New Zealand
Olympic medalists in rugby sevens
Rugby sevens players at the 2022 Commonwealth Games
Commonwealth Games bronze medallists for New Zealand
Commonwealth Games medallists in rugby sevens
Medallists at the 2022 Commonwealth Games